Vidal Rock is a rock  west of Ferrer Point in southern Discovery Bay, Greenwich Island, South Shetland Islands. It was named by the first Chilean Antarctic Expedition (1947) for mariner Osvaldo Vidal, in charge of echo sounding on the frigate Iquique.

Rock formations of Antarctica